The VL80 (ru: ВЛ80) is a Soviet (and later Russian) built electric AC mainline freight locomotive. The initials VL are those of Vladimir Lenin (ru: Владимир Ленин), after whom the class is named.

History
All variants of the series were built at the Novocherkassk Electric Locomotive Plant (NEVZ; ru: НЭВЗ) between the years 1961 and 1994. All the mechanical parts, traction engines, and auxiliary electric machinery were manufactured at the Novocherkassk plant. Some of the important components, such as the tractive transformer, were sourced from other factories.

The first VL80s were characterised by their mercury arc rectifiers. Later, they were replaced with silicon ones, thus giving birth to the ВЛ80К (en: VL80K) series. The К stands for кремний, the Russian word for silicon. Between the years 1961 and 1973, a total of 695 VL80Ks had been produced.

Currently, the VL80 series is used on all electrified routes in Russia, as well as in Kazakhstan, Uzbekistan, Belarus, and Ukraine.

Technical data
The VL80 is a dual-section (or articulated) locomotive composed of two identical units, each resting on two two-axle bogies, powered by eight НБ-418К6 (en: NB-4186K6) electric tractive motors equipped with axle-support suspension. In order to pick up the current from overhead lines, the VL80 is fitted with two pantographs; one above the driver's cab on each section. Similarly, each section of the locomotive is equipped with one ОДЦЭ-5000/25Б (en: ODCE-5000/25B) tractive transformer. The VL80T and ВЛ80С (en: VL80S) models are furnished with dynamic brakes.

VL80T
Manufactured between 1961 and 1980, the VL80T (ru: ВЛ80т) introduced a markedly different electrical system, as well as an improved lateral support system which improved the locomotive's stability. Originally, the series used spring suspension similar to that found in the VL80K, but all models built since 1971 have cradle suspension. A total of 2,107 units were made during the 19 years in which the series was in production.

VL80R
Designed for use along the difficult sections of the Krasnoyarsk, Eastern Siberia, and Far Eastern routes – as well as the "Батайск" (en: Bataysk) depot in the North Caucasus – the VL80R (ru: ВЛ80Р) has the same tractive capabilities as the VL80T and the VL80S. The difference between the VL80R and the two aforementioned models is that it has an improved anti-wheelslip system which continuously regulates the amount of voltage supplied to the traction engines, thus ensuring that an increase in thrust doesn't result in jerks, which invariably lead to wheelslip. The VL80R gets its R designation from the fact that it is fitted with regenerative braking (ru: рекуперативное торможение) mechanism.

Several locomotives, assigned to the Krasnoyarsk section, have been modernised and are capable of participating in MU operations with consists containing 3 coupled units.

Despite having been in production for almost 20 years (1967-1986), a mere 373 examples rolled out of the NEVZ plant.

Notable examples
ВЛ80Р-1549 was used as an exhibit at the Электро-77 (en: Elektro-77) expo held in Moscow in June 1977.

Built in 1982, ВЛ80Р-1718 became the 10,000th locomotive to be produced by NEVZ, since the plant's inception in 1936.

ВЛ80Р-1685 featured in the Soviet film Магистраль (en: Mainline) and has obtained cult status amongst Russian rail enthusiasts.

VL80S
The VL80S (ru: ВЛ80с) is simply a VL80T which has been modified for use in MU operations. The 'S' in its name derives from the first letter of the Russian term for multiple-unit train control: Система Многих Единиц (literally: Multiple Unit System) and commonly shortened to СМЕ.

The first VL80Ss to roll off the production line were designed to work with only two or four coupled units (or sections). In 1982, unit numbers 550, 551, and 552 were built to work with sets of two, three, or four sections. All VL80Ss built since 1983 (ВЛ80с-697 being the first of these) have this capability. The only restriction is that the consist cannot be a third trailer section equipped with dynamic brakes.

As a result of several modifications being made to the locomotive's construction, enabling it to pull additional units, the new certified weight became 192 tonnes.

A total of 2,746 examples rolled out of the NEVZ works between 1979 and 1994.

VL80SM
The last of the VL80 series, only 4 VL80SMs (ru: ВЛ80см) were built during the model's three year, post-Soviet production life (1991-1994). All four units are currently housed at the Bataysk depot in the North Caucasus.

Electric locomotives of the Soviet Union
Electric locomotives of Russia
Electric locomotives of Kazakhstan
25 kV AC locomotives
Railway locomotives introduced in 1961
5 ft gauge locomotives
Bo′Bo′+Bo′Bo′ locomotives